Ivan Andreyevich Rovny (born 30 September 1987) is a Russian professional road bicycle racer, who currently rides for UCI ProTeam .

Career
For the 2014 season, Leningrad-born Rovny joined . He was disqualified from the 2014 Vuelta a España for fighting with Italian cyclist Gianluca Brambilla on a breakaway on stage 16. In August 2016  announced that Rovny would rejoin the team on an initial two-year contract from the following season, having previously ridden for the team in 2012.

Major results

2004
 9th Road race, UCI Junior Road World Championships
2005
 1st  Road race, UCI Juniors World Championships
 1st  Road race, UEC European Junior Road Championships
 3rd  Individual pursuit, UEC European Junior Track Championships
2006
 1st  Team pursuit, 2005–06 UCI Track Cycling World Cup Classics, Carson
 Team pursuit, 2006–07 UCI Track Cycling World Cup Classics
1st  Sydney
2nd  Moscow
 1st  Points race, UEC European Under-23 Track Championships
 5th Overall Cinturón a Mallorca
 8th Grand Prix of Moscow
 9th Paris–Mantes-en-Yvelines
2007
 1st Stage 9 Tour de l'Avenir
 2nd Eindhoven Team Time Trial
 5th Overall Tour Méditerranéen
 5th Coppa Ugo Agostoni
 8th Gran Premio Città di Camaiore
 10th Trofeo Melinda
2009
 3rd Grand Prix d'Isbergues
2011
 10th Overall Vuelta a Andalucía
2012
 8th Circuito de Getxo
 10th Rund um Köln
2013
 2nd Giro di Toscana
 3rd Overall Giro della Regione Friuli Venezia Giulia
 3rd Giro dell'Appennino
 4th GP Industria & Artigianato di Larciano
 4th Tre Valli Varesine
 5th Coppa Ugo Agostoni
 6th Trofeo Matteotti
2018
 1st  Road race, National Road Championships
 9th Coppa Ugo Agostoni
 10th Overall Tour of Norway
2019
 10th Giro della Toscana
2021
 3rd Road race, National Road Championships

Grand Tour general classification results timeline

References

External links

Living people
1987 births
Russian male cyclists
Cyclists from Saint Petersburg
21st-century Russian people